Richard Cohen may refer to:

Richard Cohen (columnist) (born 1941), syndicated columnist for the Washington Post
Richard Cohen (fencer) (born 1947), British Olympic fencer and author of Chasing the Sun
Richard A. Cohen (born 1952), advocate of conversion therapy
Richard B. Cohen (born 1952), billionaire and owner of C&S Wholesale Grocers
Richard E. Cohen, congressional correspondent for National Journal
Richard I. Cohen (born 1946), professor of Jewish History at Hebrew University of Jerusalem
Richard M. Cohen (born 1948), journalist, television news producer, husband of Meredith Vieira
Richard S. Cohen (1937–1998), American lawyer and Maine Attorney General
Rich Cohen (born 1968), author of Tough Jews, The Avengers, Lake Effect, and Sweet and Low
J. Richard Cohen, former president of the Southern Poverty Law Center
Richard Cohen, New York City real estate developer and former husband of Paula Zahn
Dick Cohen (born 1949), Minnesota state senator